Gilbert Adler (born in New York City, February 14, 1946) is an American film producer who has collaborated with several notable filmmakers including Richard Donner, Brian De Palma, Walter Hill, Todd Phillips, and Bryan Singer.

In 1999, Adler -- along with Robert Zemeckis and Joel Silver -- formed Dark Castle Entertainment, a film production label formerly affiliated with Warner Bros.

Career

Adler's career spans several decades, film genres, and jobs. He began as a producer and helped shepherd Brian De Palma's low-budget family comedy feature Home Movies to the screen. The next few years weren't particularly auspicious; Adler continued working in the modest-budget sphere. In 1985 he produced the Stephen Gyllenhaal thriller Certain Fury, and the military comedy Basic Training. Over the next decade Adler found more work as he branched out into other film jobs and also found work in TV.  For example, in addition to producing over 40 episodes of the horror anthology Freddy's Nightmares (1998), he directed one and wrote four of the episodes. He repeated this trifecta soon afterwards in a new job, the similar Tales From the Crypt (1991). In 1998, Adler directed one episode of the teen witch series Charmed, and for the re-imagining of the tropics-set drama Fantasy Island. It is in movies that Alder generally has concentrated his efforts, however. Working often, he's received producer credit on a raft of features, including the '06 superhero reboot "Superman Returns" and "Valkyrie," a biopic about would-be Hitler assassin Colonel Claus von Stauffenberg, starring Tom Cruise.

Filmography
He was a producer in all films unless otherwise noted.

Film

As writer

As director

As an actor

Television

As writer

As director

Miscellaneous crew

As an actor

Second unit director or assistant director

References

External links

Living people
American film producers
1946 births